The Vietnamese leaf-toed gecko (Dixonius vietnamensis) is a species of lizards in the family Gekkonidae. It is native of Cambodia and Vietnam.

References

V
Reptiles of Cambodia
Reptiles of Vietnam
Reptiles described in 2004